Darkness in Tallinn (a.k.a. "City Unplugged") (Estonian language: Tallinn pimeduses) is a 1993 feature film, a satirical political thriller directed by Ilkka Järvi-Laturi and written by Paul Kolsby. The film premiered on September 12, 1993 at the Toronto Festival of Festivals, and later played at the Sundance Film Festival in January 1994. Written by an American and directed by a Finn (the two met at New York University), the film was one of the more unusual and most popular of 1993. It was reshown at the Rotterdam Filmfestival 2013 for professional audience.

Cast
Ivo Uukkivi as Toivo
Elina Aasa as Violinist
Milena Gulbe as Maria
Jüri Järvet as Anton
Kristel Kärner as Extra
Kadri Kilvet as Nurse
Salme Poopuu as Nurse
Andres Raag as Contreras
Enn Klooren as Mikhail
Ulvi Kreitsmann as Nurse
Väino Laes as Andres
Kristel Leesmend as Saleswoman
Anna-Liisa Lehtimetsä as Extra
Leida Paju as Cleaning woman
Külli Palmsaar as Extra
Kerstin Raidma as Gang girl
Salme Reek as Shoplady
Garmen Tabor as Diana

References

External links
 
 Järvilaturis Filmproduction

1993 films
Estonian-language films
Films set in Tallinn
1990s Finnish-language films
Political satire films
1990s political thriller films
1990s satirical films
Finnish thriller films
Finnish satirical films
Finnish multilingual films
Estonian multilingual films
1993 multilingual films